Flegg High Ormiston Academy (formerly Flegg High School) is an 11–16 mixed secondary school with academy status in Martham, Great Yarmouth, Norfolk, England.

Description 
It was built in the 1960s for boys and girls aged 12–16. Much of the school has been expanded over the years and in 2006/07 major building work was undertaken to accommodate the inclusion of Year 7 pupils, and generally update the buildings, bringing the school roll in September 2007 up to near 1,000 pupils.

Flegg High has a specialism in Business and Enterprise, and is a National Hub for that specialism. The school was rated Good in the 2016 Ofsted.

In February 2018, Ormiston Academies Trust took over the high school, turning it into an academy. It was renamed "Flegg High Ormiston Academy".

Academics 
Flegg students complete a Key Stage 3 in three years where the full Key Stage 3 National Curriculum is covered.
Key Stage 4 commences in Year 10, allowing the students the opportunity to study core subjects and 4 in greater depth than in Key Stage 3.This follows the Ormiston teaching philosophy of Teach and Develop and Change.

References

External links 
 

Secondary schools in Norfolk
Academies in Norfolk
Norwich City F.C.
Ormiston Academies
Martham